William Burega (March 13, 1932 – August 23, 2020)  was a Canadian professional ice hockey defenceman who played four games in the National Hockey League with the Toronto Maple Leafs during the 1955–56 season. The rest of his career, which lasted from 1952 to 1970, was spent in the minor leagues.

Career statistics

Regular season and playoffs

Awards and achievements
 MJHL First All-Star Team (1951)
 Calder Cup (AHL) Championship (1955)
 WHL Championship (1956)
 OHA Sr First All-Star Team (1967)
 OHA Sr Second All-Star Team (1970)

References

External links
 

1932 births
2020 deaths
Buffalo Bisons (AHL) players
Calgary Stampeders (WHL) players
Canadian ice hockey defencemen
Los Angeles Blades (WHL) players
Maritime Major Hockey League players
Ontario Hockey Association Senior A League (1890–1979) players
Ottawa Senators (QSHL) players
Pittsburgh Hornets players
Quebec Aces (QSHL) players
Saskatoon Quakers players
Sault Thunderbirds players
Spokane Spokes players
Ice hockey people from Winnipeg
Toronto Maple Leafs players
Vancouver Canucks (WHL) players
Winnipeg Canadians players
Winnipeg Monarchs players
Winnipeg Warriors (minor pro) players